Cultybraggan Camp lies close to the village of Comrie, in west Perthshire, Scotland. It was first used as a prisoner of war (PoW) camp during World War II, and then became an Army training area. It later housed a Royal Observer Corps (ROC) nuclear monitoring post, and a Regional Government Headquarters (RGHQ). The associated training areas are still in use with the Ministry of Defence.

History
James V of Scotland came to Cultybraggan in September 1532 to hunt deer. Records survive of the food he consumed included bread, ale, and fish sent from Stirling.

Second World War

Named PoW camp No 21, built in 1941 to house 4,000 Category A prisoners, Cultybraggan was a 'black camp', holding those considered the most committed and fanatical Nazi PoWs, mainly young Waffen-SS, Fallschirmjäger and U-boat crew. Army, Kriegsmarine, Air Force and SS prisoners were held in separate compounds, as were the officers. An additional camp was located at Cowden, two miles distant.

Ringleaders of the Devizes plot – to break as many as 250,000 PoWs out of camps across the country in 1944 and attack Britain from within – were sent to Camp 21 at Comrie. These included Feldwebel Wolfgang Rosterg, a known anti-Nazi who was sent by mistake. He was lynched, and five of the prisoners were hanged at Pentonville Prison for his murder, the largest multiple execution in 20th-century Britain.

Amongst the prisoners was Heinrich Steinmeyer, soldier in the Waffen SS since 1942, who was captured in Normandy in August 1944. He died in 2014 and left a bequest of £384,000 to the village which has been put into the Heinrich Steinmeyer Legacy Fund.

Post war
Following the war, in 1949, Cultybraggan was opened as a training camp. It was used by the Regular Army, the Territorial Army and was popular with Cadet units for their annual camps. Units rotating through the camp enabled 80,000 'man training days' of military exercising, including adventure training, cross-country driving, and helicopter operations, using the  Tighnablair Training Area, leased from the Drummond Estate.

Some of the original 100 Nissen huts on the western side of the camp were demolished in the 1970s to make way for a firing range, but the majority remain. The surviving huts, together with an assault course and modern Officers' Mess facility, make Cultybraggan "one of the three best preserved purpose-built WWII prisoner of war camps in Britain". In 2006, a number of structures at the camp were listed by Historic Scotland. Huts 19, 20, and 44–46 are category A listed as being of national significance, while huts 1–3, 21, 29–39, and 47–57 are category B listed.

Cold War

As part of the Cold War defence of the nation, an underground Royal Observer Corps (ROC) monitoring post was installed in 1960. Although it closed in September 1991, when the ROC was stood down, it is still accessible.

In 1990, an underground Regional Government Headquarters (RGHQ) bunker was completed in the north east corner of the camp site to replace the Scottish North Zone Headquarters bunker at Troywood (Anstruther). In the event of war, the Secretary of State for Scotland, the BBC, British Telecom, and other important organisations would have operated from here. However, the Cold War threat receded almost as soon as the bunker was completed, and the £3.6 million, two-storey, underground structure was declared obsolete, and closed. Sold to the Army, the bunker was added to the military training facilities.

Comrie Development Trust
The camp ceased to be used by the military in 2004, and now belongs to the Comrie Development Trust, bought through a community right-to-buy option for £350,000 in 2007. Since taking ownership of the  site on 20 September 2007, the Comrie Development Trust's Cultybraggan Working Group have been working towards the sustainable development of this asset. Major infrastructure works (drainage, electricity, water and telecoms), the conversion of nine Nissen huts to make 12 units for local businesses and the refurbishment of the central mess are included in the first phase. In 2012 it was reported that a communications firm had purchased the underground bunker at Cultybraggan for use as a "digital safe house". However, the bid failed and the bunker was put back on the market. In April 2014, the bunker was sold at auction to a service provider who are looking to use it for long term data and media storage.

References

External links
Cultybraggan, Comrie Development Trust
Cultybraggan RGHQ, Subterranea Britannica

Barracks in Scotland
World War II prisoner of war camps in Scotland
Community buyouts in Scotland
Category A listed buildings in Perth and Kinross
Category B listed buildings in Perth and Kinross
1941 establishments in Scotland